Dark Sky Distance is a Professional Distance Running Team sponsored by Under Armour and based in Flagstaff, Arizona. The team focuses on events ranging from 1500m to Marathon with representation from the US and Internationally.

History 
The group was founded in the Fall of 2020 with an initial roster of 10 runners. The group is named after the dark night skies found in Flagstaff, due to the city's commitment to reducing light pollution. The training group was founded with Stephen Haas as a head coach.

Athletes

Current Athletes 

 Sharon Lokedi
 Neil Gourley
 Kasey Knevelbaard
 Weini Kelati
 Katie Snowden
 Jack Anstey
 Blake Haney
 Eduardo Herrera
 Matt Llano
 Jacob Thomson
 Regan Yee
 Alycia Cridebring
 Ben Veatch
 Diego Zarate

Coaches 

 Stephen Haas
 Pat Casey

References 

Grouping